First Life is a 2010 British nature documentary series written and presented by David Attenborough, also known by the expanded titles David Attenborough's First Life (UK) and First Life with David Attenborough (USA). It was first broadcast in the US as a two-hour special on the Discovery Channel on 24 October 2010. In the United Kingdom it was broadcast as a two-part series on BBC Two on 5 November 2010. First Life sees Attenborough tackle the subject of the origin of life on Earth. He investigates the evidence from the earliest fossils, which suggest that complex animals first appeared in the oceans around 540 million years ago, an event known as the Cambrian Explosion. Trace fossils of multicellular organisms from an even earlier period, the Ediacaran biota, are also examined. Attenborough travels to Canada, Morocco and Australia, using some of the latest fossil discoveries and their nearest equivalents amongst living species to reveal what life may have been like at that time. Visual effects and computer animation are used to reconstruct and animate the extinct life forms.
Attenborough's Journey, a documentary film profiling the presenter as he journeyed around the globe filming First Life, was shown on BBC Two on 24 October 2010. A hardback book to accompany the series, authored by Matt Kaplan with a foreword by Attenborough, was published in September 2010.

Production
The series was directed by freelance film-maker Martin Williams and series produced by Anthony Geffen, CEO and Executive Producer of Atlantic Productions, with whom Attenborough has collaborated on a number of 3D documentaries for the satellite broadcaster Sky. It was produced in association with the BBC, the Discovery Channel and the Australian Broadcasting Corporation. During production, it had the working title The First Animals.

Reception
At the News & Documentary Emmy Awards in 2011, First Life won in all three categories it was nominated in, for writing, graphic design and art direction and nature programming. The series was nominated for its photography and editing at the BAFTA Craft Awards earlier the same year.

Episodes

David Attenborough's Rise of Animals: Triumph of the Vertebrates
In December 2011, a second series of First Life was announced by media website Realscreen. The new series focused on the evolution of the earliest fish, reptiles, amphibians and mammals, and aired on the BBC in 2013, as David Attenborough's Rise of Animals: Triumph of the Vertebrates.

References

External links 
Official website for David Attenborough's First Life

First Life on the Eden website
First Life at the BBC Press Office website (see "Nature" panel on right hand side of page)

2010s British documentary television series
2010 British television series debuts
2010 British television series endings
Documentary television shows about evolution
First Life
Documentary films about nature
Documentary films about prehistoric life
Discovery Channel original programming